Enida japonica is a species of sea snail, a marine gastropod mollusk in the family Trochidae, the top snails.

Description
The depressed-conical shell is profoundly umbilicated. The 5½ whorls are slightly convex and ornamented with transverse granulose lirae. The interstices are obliquely longitudinally striated. The body whorl is encircled by a prominent crenulated carina at the periphery. The aperture is subquadrate. The inner lip is reflexed in the middle. The outer lip smooth within. The base of the shell shows a close grnuulose line. The umbilicus is moderate. The color of the shell is pale brown, ornamented with radiating brown patches.

Distribution
This marine species occurs off Japan.

References

 Higo, S., Callomon, P. & Goto, Y. (1999). Catalogue and bibliography of the marine shell-bearing Mollusca of Japan. Osaka: Elle Scientific Publications. 749 pp.

External links
 To Encyclopedia of Life
 To World Register of Marine Species

japonica
Gastropods described in 1860